Ralph Tabakin (September 22, 1921 – May 13, 2001) was an American actor.

Career
In his acting career, Tabakin is most associated with the work of Barry Levinson, as he appeared in fifteen of Levinson's films from Diner onward.  His appearance in Diner began after a visit to the set where he impressed Levinson. Considered a lucky charm of Levinson, Tabakin is perhaps best known for playing medical examiner Dr. Scheiner on the Levinson-produced TV series Homicide: Life on the Street, a recurring character from the first episode through all seven seasons and the follow-up Homicide: The Movie.

Personal life
Born in San Antonio, Texas, he was the middle child in a family of five. They would also live in New Orleans, Louisiana, before moving and settling in Richmond, Virginia. He was a World War II veteran, being decorated with five Purple Hearts and two Bronze Stars. He also worked as a Federal Aviation Administration engineer for several years. He died in 2001 due to heart disease. He is buried in Judean Memorial Gardens in Olney, Maryland.

Filmography

See also
Late bloomer

References

External links

1921 births
2001 deaths
American male film actors
American male television actors
People from Silver Spring, Maryland
20th-century American male actors
United States Army personnel of World War II
United States Army soldiers